Nicolás Enrique Ramírez Aguilera (born 1 May 1997) is a Chilean footballer who currently plays for Chilean club Huachipato as a central defender.

International career
Ramírez represented Chile at under-20 level in the 2017 South American Championship and at under-23 level in the 2020 Pre-Olympic Tournament.

In addition, he took part of the Chile squad in the 2019 Toulon Tournament.

Career statistics

Club

References

External links
 Profile at Universidad de Chile
 

Living people
1997 births
Footballers from Santiago
Chilean footballers
Chile under-20 international footballers
Universidad de Chile footballers
Deportes Temuco footballers
C.D. Huachipato footballers
Chilean Primera División players
Association football central defenders